Deborah Oppenheimer is an American film and television producer.  She won an Academy Award in 2001 for best documentary feature for producing Into the Arms of Strangers: Stories of the Kindertransport (2000). The film, about the British rescue operation known as the Kindertransport, which saved the lives of nearly 10,000 children from Nazi-occupied Germany, Austria, Czechoslovakia, and Danzig, was written and directed by Mark Jonathan Harris, released by Warner Bros., and made with the cooperation of the United States Holocaust Memorial Museum. Judi Dench narrated. Following its theatrical release, it appeared on HBO and PBS.

In 2014, Into the Arms of Strangers: Stories of the Kindertransport was deemed "culturally, historically, or aesthetically significant" by the Library of Congress and selected for preservation for all time in the National Film Registry.

Oppenheimer co-wrote the teacher's study guide and co-authored with Harris the film's companion book of the same name by Bloomsbury Publishing (2000; reissued 2018). It has a preface by Lord Richard Attenborough and an introduction by historian David Cesarani.

Oppenheimer's feature-length documentary, Foster, presented by Participant and Emerson Collective, premiered theatrically and on HBO in May 2019 during Foster Care Awareness Month. Reunited with writer/director Harris and several of the award-winning production team from Into the Arms of Strangers, the film is a revealing first-hand look at the complex foster care system as seen through the eyes of those who know it best. In November 2019, the National Council for Adoption presented the film with its Excellence in Foster Care Media Award. The film received a nomination for the 2020 Writers Guild of America Award for Best Documentary Screenplay. One of the film's subjects, Mrs. Earcylene Beavers, was recognized in November 2019 as an Angel in America by the Congressional Coalition on Adoption Institute at their annual Angels in Adoption Hill Day. She was nominated for the honor by Congressmember Karen Bass.

Oppenheimer conceived and led U.S. strategies and was production consultant to the Carnival Films television series, Downton Abbey, during its complete run. The series was executive produced by Gareth Neame and written by Julian Fellowes. Downton Abbey is the most nominated non-U.S. show in history and the highest rated PBS drama ever.

As Executive Vice President of Carnival Films, Oppenheimer developed and executive produced Christopher Guest's Family Tree for HBO and BBC1, starring Chris O'Dowd.

As President of Bruce Helford's Mohawk Productions at Warner Bros., Oppenheimer executive produced hundreds of episodes of television shows starring Drew Carey, George Lopez, Wanda Sykes, Norm Macdonald, Bernie Mac, Will Ferrell, Jean Smart, Jurnee Smollett, and Pamela Adlon and worked with development partners including Sandra Bullock, Kenya Barris, Stephanie Savage, McG, and more.

Oppenheimer was associate producer for the Cable ACE Award-winning production of the Showtime / PBS drama, Master Harold...and the Boys, written by Athol Fugard, produced by Michael Brandman, directed by Michael Lindsay-Hogg, and starring Tony-award winning actors John Kani, Matthew Broderick, and Zakes Mokae.

Biography

Awards and recognition

References

 "Cinematic Treasures Named to National Film Registry". Library of Congress. December 17, 2014. Retrieved January 30, 2018.
 "Foster: HBO Acquires Worldwide Rights to Deborah Oppenheimer & Mark Jonathan Harris' Documentary".
 "HBO Documentary Films acquires Mark Jonathan Harris' Foster.

External links

Deborah Oppenheimer website

American television producers
American women television producers
American film producers
Living people
Year of birth missing (living people)
21st-century American women